ThePalatka Daily News is a local newspaper published in Palatka, Florida, United States,pears every Wednesday, Thursday and Saturday, beginning Wednesday, April 12. It was founded in 1885. Coverage includes local news, sports and community events in Putnam County. Other spin-off publications are also in print. The group is owned by Community Newspapers, Incorporated, based in Athens, Georgia.

References

External links 

 Official website
 Historic issues at Florida and Puerto Rico Digital Newspaper Project:
Palatka Daily News (1884-1888)
Palatka News (1905, 1907)
Palatka News and Advertiser (1902-1905, 1910-1917)
Palatka Daily News (1919, 1921-1922)

1885 establishments in Florida
Newspapers published in Florida
Publications established in 1885